The Greensboro Historic District is a historic district in the city of Greensboro, Alabama. Greensboro was incorporated as a town in December 1823 as Greensborough. The community was known as Troy prior to that time. The historic district is centered on Main Street and runs from Hobson Street on the western side of the city to 1st Street on the eastern side. It features examples of Federal, Greek Revival, and regional vernacular architecture. One significant contributing property is Magnolia Hall. It was placed on the National Register of Historic Places on August 13, 1976.

References

External links
 
 
 
 
 

National Register of Historic Places in Hale County, Alabama
Historic districts in Hale County, Alabama
Federal architecture in Alabama
Greek Revival architecture in Alabama
1976 establishments in Alabama
Historic American Buildings Survey in Alabama
Historic districts on the National Register of Historic Places in Alabama